Philosophy of dialogue is a type of philosophy based on the work of the Austrian-born Jewish philosopher Martin Buber best known through its classic presentation in his 1923 book I and Thou. For Buber, the fundamental fact of human existence, too readily overlooked by scientific rationalism and abstract philosophical thought, is "man with man", a dialogue which takes place in the "sphere of between" ("das Zwischenmenschliche").

See also 
 Dialogical analysis
 Dialogical logic
 Dialogical self
 Interfaith dialogue
 Intersubjectivity
I and Thou

References

Further reading 
 Rob Anderson, Leslie A. Baxter, Kenneth N. Cissna (Eds.). (2004). Dialogue: theorizing difference in communication studies.
 Peter Atterton, Matthew Calarco, Maurice S. Friedman (2004). Lévinas & Buber: dialogue & difference
 Samuel Hugo Bergman (1991). Dialogical philosophy from Kierkegaard to Buber.
 Kenneth N. Cissna & Rob Anderson (2002). Moments of meeting: Buber, Rogers, and the potential for public dialogue.
 Hans Köchler (2009). The Philosophy and Politics of Dialogue.
 Tim L. Kellebrew (2012). Brief Overview of Dialogical Psychotherapy
 Tim L. Kellebrew (2013). On the World as Misrepresentation
 Hune Margulies (2017),  Will and Grace: Meditations on the Dialogical Philosophy of Martin Buber

External links 
 Martin Buber, Stanford Encyclopedia of Philosophy.
 I and Thou – selected passages
 Margulies, Hune (2017), Will and Grace: Meditations on the Dialogical Philosophy of Martin Buber.

Continental philosophy